Stewart's College FP RFC was a Scottish rugby union club in Edinburgh.

Founded

The club was founded in 1875, when a match took place between the former pupils of Daniel Stewart's Hospital and George Watson's College.

In 1887, the club became a member of the Scottish Rugby Union.

They played at Inverleith Sports Ground, the venue for Scotland's home games between 1899 and 1925, during which time the first match against New Zealand was played. Inverleith still boasts some of the best playing facilities in Edinburgh.

Merger
Daniel Stewart's College merged with Melville's College in 1973. The college's former pupil rugby clubs - Stewart's College FP and Melville College FP - also merged at this time to found a new rugby club: Stewart's Melville FP.

Notable former players

Scotland internationalists

Edinburgh District players

The following former Stewart's College FP players have represented Edinburgh District at provincial level.

Honours

 Melrose Sevens
 Champions (2): 1920, 1956
 Langholm Sevens
 Champions (4): 1948, 1951, 1957, 1965
 Hawick Sevens
 Champions (3): 1937, 1952, 1959
 Gala Sevens
 Champions (1): 1952
 Jed-Forest Sevens
 Champions (5): 1934, 1946, 1948, 1959, 1960
 Heriots Sevens
 Champions: 1950

References

Scottish rugby union teams
Rugby union in Edinburgh
Sports teams in Edinburgh
Defunct Scottish rugby union clubs
Rugby union clubs disestablished in 1973